The Siberian elm cultivar Ulmus pumila 'Mauro' hails from the G & M nursery at Dodewaard, Netherlands, where it is listed as Ulmus pendula 'Mauro'.

Description 
The tree has a pronounced weeping habit, but otherwise resembles the species.

Pests and diseases
The tree is claimed to be fully resistant 'to all diseases'.

Cultivation
The tree is not known (2016) to be in cultivation beyond the Netherlands. It is claimed the tree is able to 'grow easily in all soils'.

Accessions
None known

Nurseries

Europe
The Tree Centre, Opheusden, Netherlands

Notes

Siberian elm cultivar
Ulmus articles missing images
Ulmus